Jorge Hernández González (born 22 February 1988) is a Mexican former professional footballer who played as a midfielder.

Career
Born in Guadalajara, Jalisco, Hernández was signed along with fellow Mexican U-17 national Efraín Juárez by Barcelona in 2006 after impressing the Spanish giants during the 2005 FIFA U-17 World Championship. However, due to Spanish registration rules limiting the number of non-EU players in club squads, neither of the pair were able to be registered for the Barcelona B-team, forcing Barcelona to loan them out to Tercera División team Barbate. Hernández soon grew unhappy with Spanish fourth-tier football and returned to Atlas after the 2007 CONCACAF U20 Tournament in Mexico (where Mexico qualified for the 2007 FIFA U-20 World Cup).

International career
He played for the under-20 team, which qualified for the 2007 FIFA U-20 World Cup in Canada.

International appearances
As of 16 April 2008

Honours
Tijuana
Liga MX: Apertura 2012

Mexico U17
FIFA U-17 World Championship: 2005

References

External links

1988 births
Living people
Mexico youth international footballers
Mexico under-20 international footballers
Mexico international footballers
Mexican expatriate footballers
Mexican footballers
Atlas F.C. footballers
Atlante F.C. footballers
Atlético Morelia players
Club Tijuana footballers
Santos Laguna footballers
Leones Negros UdeG footballers
Footballers from Guadalajara, Jalisco
Association football midfielders
C.D. Veracruz footballers
Expatriate footballers in Costa Rica